The Royal Belgian Korfball Federation (Dutch:  Koninklijke Belgische Korfbalbond, or KBKB) is the governing body of korfball in Belgium. The federation is structured as an Association without lucrative purpose. It organises the main Belgian korfball league and the more recreative leagues, and the Belgian national team.

History

The federation was founded in Antwerp on 28 April 1921 as Belgian Korfball Federation (Dutch: Belgische Korfbalbond, or BKB). In 1953 the federation was allowed to add the title Royal to its official name.

The Royal Belgian Korfball Federation was one of the founders of the International Korfball Federation, with the Dutch Federation, on 11 June 1933.

Competitions

On a yearly basis, the federation organizes three top tier domestic competitions:
 Topkorfballeague indoor
 Topkorfballeague outdoor
 Belgian Cup (outdoor)

References

Korfball in Belgium
Korfball governing bodies
Organisations based in Belgium with royal patronage
Korfball